The 2020–21 Premier League of Eswatini is the 43rd season of the Premier League of Eswatini, the top-tier football league in Eswatini (formerly Swaziland), since its establishment in 1971. The season started late on 12 December 2020 due to the COVID-19 pandemic in Eswatini.

Teams
The previous season was abandoned with no teams relegated, so the season began with 16 instead of 14 teams, after the addition of the two promoted teams, Tinyosi and Tambankulu Callies.

League table

</onlyinclude>

Stadiums

References

Football leagues in Eswatini
Premier League
Premier League
Eswatini
Premier League of Eswatini, 2020–21